Palmerston ministry may refer to:

 First Palmerston ministry, the British minority (later majority) government led by Lord Palmerston from 1855 to 1858
 Second Palmerston ministry, the British majority government led by Lord Palmerston from 1859 to 1865